Nikolay Ovcharov (Bulgarian: Николай Овчаров) (born 1957 in Veliko Tarnovo) is a Bulgarian archaeologist and thracologist. He graduated history in Sofia University in 1976 and  specialized Thracology in Bulgarian Academy of Sciences. Now Professor Ovcharov teaches history in the New Bulgarian University and the Slavic University in Moscow. He has published 18 books and more than 250 articles. Nikolay Ovcharov discovered a unique ancient Thracian city of Perperikon in the Eastern Rhodopes. It is thought that the famous sanctuary and oracular shrine dedicated to Dionysus of the Bessi was situated there. Later he discovered an ancient Thracian surface tomb in Tatul which was soon recognized as an exclusive religious centre. According to Ovcharov, the site is the sanctuary and tomb of an influential Thracian leader who was deified after his death. He links it with the cult of Orpheus.

In 2005, German scholars from the University of Heidelberg confirmed that the two rather small fragments discovered by Ovcharov in the Eastern Rhodopes mountains are written in the Minoan Linear A script from about 15th century BC.

In August 2006, Ovcharov claimed that a stone tile dating allegedly to 5,000 BC contains some unknown writing. The tile is believed to have been unearthed in Bulgaria in the 1980s.

References

External links
Perperikon.bg - official site
 

1957 births
Living people
Bulgarian archaeologists
Thracologists